Marion Gröbner is an Austrian football midfielder, currently playing in the German 2. Bundesliga for Herforder SV, with whom she has also played the top category. She previously played for SG Ardagger/Neustadtl, SV Neulengbach, Union Kleinmünchen and USC Landhaus in the ÖFB-Frauenliga. In 2008, she was named the Frauenliga's footballer of the year.

She is a member of the Austrian national team since 2003.

References

1985 births
Living people
Austrian women's footballers
Expatriate women's footballers in Germany
SV Neulengbach (women) players
USC Landhaus Wien players
Austrian expatriate sportspeople in Germany
Austrian expatriate footballers
People from Scheibbs District
Women's association football midfielders
Women's association football forwards
Footballers from Lower Austria
Union Kleinmünchen players
ÖFB-Frauenliga players
2. Frauen-Bundesliga players